East Bay Walls, also known as the Berkeley Mystery Walls, is a misnomer, as there are many such crude walls throughout the hills surrounding the San Francisco Bay Area, and go as far as Chico and Red Bluff California.  In places, they are up to a meter high and a meter wide and are built without mortar; the walls run in sections anywhere from a few meters to over a half mile long. The rocks used to construct the walls are a variety of sizes.  Some are basketball-sized rocks, while others are large sandstone boulders weighing a ton or more.  Parts of the wall seem to be just piles of rocks, but in other places it appears the walls were carefully constructed.  The exact age of the walls is unknown, but they have an old appearance.  Many of the formations have sunk far into the earth, and are often completely overgrown with different plants.

Purpose
The walls are not continuous and are composed of multiple sections, so they are not fences.  They are not tall enough to have been used as defensive barriers.  The East Bay Regional Park District simply calls them "rock walls" and notes that they are not mysterious. Livestock, such as cattle, have grazed in the east and south Bay Area hills since the arrival of European settlers. Clearing land of scattered rocks would have eased the ability to move livestock. Placing the rocks into walls would have helped to guide the movement of the animals or to help corral them.

Origin
No written documentation exists to identify when they were built, by whom, or why.

Some people considered the Ohlone to have been the builders, although they were hunter-gatherers and are not known to have built permanent structures.

Recent testing of lichen on the rocks suggests that they were probably built between 1850 and 1880, the early American era in California. Settlers might have built the walls using Chinese, Mexican, or Native American laborers, although specifically who built them has not been determined.

Locations

The stone walls are accessible in several area parks, including  Ed R. Levin County Park in Santa Clara County  and Mission Peak Regional Preserve in Alameda County, as well as many other parks.

Archaeological sites
As of 2016, archaeologist Jeffrey Fentress is measuring and mapping the walls to eventually gain protection from development or other destruction. Additional stone walls with unclear origin or purpose occur in other places near the San Francisco Bay, and researchers continue to discover more information about the walls.

References

External links 
 Uncovering the Real Story Behind the 'East Bay Mystery Walls' on KQED-FM Bay Curious

Archaeological sites in California
History of the San Francisco Bay Area
Buildings and structures in Berkeley, California